The Evansville Otters are a professional baseball team based in Evansville, Indiana.  They compete in the West Division of the independent Frontier League. Since their establishment in 1995, the Otters have played at historic Bosse Field, which originally opened in 1915. The Otters are the oldest current team in the Frontier League and have won two championships (2006 and 2016).

History

When the Otters began play in 1995, they returned baseball to Evansville for the first time in a decade. The city had been without a team since the Evansville Triplets relocated following the 1984 season.

The Otters have been a success on the field and off since their first season of play in Evansville. On the field the Otters have reached the playoffs in 9 seasons, including six Frontier League Championship series with FLCS wins in 2006 and 2016.

Off the field, the Otters set numerous league attendance records in their early seasons. The Otters drew 90,000 fans in their first season, more than the entire Frontier League had in its inaugural season two years earlier. The Otters have averaged over 2,500 fans per game since they started playing at Bosse Field in Evansville, most recently setting a 2013 league best with 3,200 fans per game. 

The first Evansville Otters game was played on June 15, 1995. The Otters were awarded the Frontier League Organization of the Year Award in 1997, and the Commissioner's Award of Excellence in 2004. They earned their 689th win, a league record, on August 18, 2011. The team hosted the largest crowd ever at Bosse Field on July 24, 2013, with 8,253 fans in attendance. The Otters welcomed their 2,000,000th fan to the ballpark on August 18, 2013.

The Otters have promoted over 50 of their players to Major League Baseball franchises including two players in 2013 (1B/DH Andrew Clark, New York Yankees and RHP Bryce Morrow, San Diego Padres). Three Otters have gone on to careers at the major league level including George Sherrill, a 2008 MLB All-Star, Oakland Athletics pitcher Andrew Werner, and pitcher Brandyn Sittinger Arizona Diamondbacks .

The success of the Otters in Evansville led to the move of more Frontier League teams to larger cities, many of which have built new ballparks, leading to the increased stability and success of the league in recent years.

On May 27, 2014, the Otters became the first team in the Frontier League to reach 800 wins.

Season-by-season records

Current roster

Notable alumni
 George Sherrill (1999–2000)
 Andrew Werner (2009–2010)
 Brett Marshall (2015)
 Ty Hensley (2018)
 Brandyn Sittinger (2019)

See also

Sports in Evansville

References

External links
 Evansville Otters
 Otters page at OurSports Central

Frontier League teams
Professional baseball teams in Indiana
Sports in Evansville, Indiana
1995 establishments in Indiana
Baseball teams established in 1995